Panicum dichotomiflorum, known by the common names fall panicgrass, autumn millet (Britain and Ireland), and fall panicum is a species of Poaceae "true grass". It is native to much of the eastern United States and parts of Canada, and it can be found in the Western United States through California. It may be an introduced species in some western climates. It grows in many types of habitat, including disturbed areas and chaparral habitats.

Description
Panicum dichotomiflorum is an annual grass growing decumbent or erect to a maximum height near one meter-3 feet. It can be distinguished from its relative, Panicum capillare - Witchgrass by its hairless leaves. The inflorescence is a large open panicle up to 20 centimeters long and fanning out to a width of 16 centimeters.

References

External links
Jepson Manual Treatment - Panicum dichotomiflorum
USDA Plants Profile
Illinois Wildflowers
Panicum dichotomiflorum - Photo gallery

dichotomiflorum
Grasses of Canada
Grasses of the United States
Flora of the Eastern United States
Native grasses of Texas